Alessandro Bianconi (born 20 January 1999) is an Italian footballer who plays as defender for  club Lecco on loan from Ancona.

Club career
He was raised in the youth teams of Bologna and was first called up to the senior squad on 17 January 2017 for a Coppa Italia game against Inter.

For the 2018–19 season, he was loaned to Serie D club Tuttocuoio.

On 20 July 2019, he joined Serie C club Como on loan. He made his professional Serie C debut for Como on 5 October 2019 in a game against Giana Erminio. He substituted Alessio Iovine in the 76th minute.

On 31 January 2023, Bianconi joined Lecco on loan.

International career
He was first called up to represent his country on 12 April 2017 for the Under-18 squad friendly against Ukraine.

References

External links
 

1999 births
Living people
Sportspeople from the Metropolitan City of Bologna
Footballers from Emilia-Romagna
Italian footballers
Italy youth international footballers
Association football defenders
Serie C players
Serie D players
Bologna F.C. 1909 players
A.C. Tuttocuoio 1957 San Miniato players
Como 1907 players
A.C. Gozzano players
Ancona-Matelica players
Calcio Lecco 1912 players